Borg El Arab University Hospital is a teaching hospital One of Alexandria University Hospitals, its included on the first governmental center specialized in treating children cancer free of charge in Egypt. It was established in 2008 as a result of a cooperation concluded between the Egyptian and Dutch government as a university hospital  It located in the central axis area in New Borg El Arab city in Alexandria Governorate, northern Egypt, on an area of 107 acres. The hospital provides its services mainly to residents of the governorates of Alexandria, Kafr El Sheikh, Beheira, and Matrouh.

Departments and specializations

Pediatric Oncology Center 
Pediatric Oncology Center was established in 2018 as hospital specializing in the treatment of children's cancer. The Center in the first phase consists of a main building on an area of 5 acres, consisting of four floors; The first floor for surgery, the second for hematology, the third for solid tumors, and the fourth for one-day treatment.

The hospital has a capacity of about 80 patient beds, 6 beds for intensive care, and 5 operating rooms. Since its conversion into a hospital specializing in the treatment of children's cancer, the hospital has received about 4,900 children with cancer until the end of 2020, with an average of about 1,600 children annually.

During the same period, 60 surgeries were performed per month. Work is currently underway to establish a radiotherapy center equipped with the latest equipment. In the second phase, 2 additional buildings will be constructed as expansions for the Children's Cancer Hospital, as well as a Cancer Research Center, an educational school, and an adult cancer hospital. With a capacity of 200 beds.

Outpatient surgery 
The hospital includes many other medical specialties other than oncology, which are cardiology, brain and nerves, gynecology and obstetrics, ophthalmology, pediatrics, internal medicine, nutrition, ear, nose and throat, dentistry, surgery, physical therapy, dialysis units, and orthopedics, in addition to three Specialized laboratories are the clinical pathology lab, the microbiology lab, and the pathology lab, and it also includes a blood bank.

Photo gallery

See also
 Children's Cancer Hospital Egypt.
 National Cancer Institute (Egypt).

References

External links 

 Pediatric Oncology Center

Alexandria University
Cancer hospitals
Children's hospitals
Teaching hospitals
Hospitals in Alexandria
New Borg El Arab
2008 establishments in Egypt